Grewia orientalis is a species of flowering plant in India and Sri Lanka.

References

External links
 Linnean-online.org
 Uniprot.org
 Indiabiodiversity.org

orientalis
Flora of the Indian subcontinent